AQC may refer to:

 Adiabatic quantum computation, a quantum computing model that relies on the adiabatic theorem to do calculations
 Analytical quality control in laboratories
 AQC (airport), an airport in Klawock, Alaska
 Association Québécoise de Criminalistique [Canada]

See also 
 aqc, the ISO 639-3 code for the Archi language of the Caucasus